Cicatrion is a genus of beetles in the family Cerambycidae, containing the following species:

 Cicatrion calidum Martins & Napp, 1986
 Cicatrion constricticolle (Martins, 1962)

References

Ibidionini